Armand Savoie (9 December 1929 – 18 May 1988) was a Canadian boxer. He competed in the men's featherweight event at the 1948 Summer Olympics. At the 1948 Summer Olympics, he beat Jamshid Fani and Clotilde Colon before losing to Ernesto Formenti in the quarter-finals.

References

1929 births
1988 deaths
Canadian male boxers
Olympic boxers of Canada
Boxers at the 1948 Summer Olympics
Boxers from Montreal
French Quebecers
Featherweight boxers